Miloslav Balun (also credited as Miroslav Balun; 14 December 1920 – 25 December 1994) was a Czechoslovak pair skater. With Soňa Balunová, he became the 1954 European bronze medalist and a six-time national champion. He also competed in volleyball.

In 1953, Balun began working as a skating coach in Prague. He later worked in Russia (1963–1964) and Linz, Austria (from 1967). He married Balunová in 1950. Their daughter, Sonja Balun (born in 1955), competed for Austria in ladies' single skating.

Competitive highlights
With Soňa Balunová

References

1920 births
1994 deaths
People from Hodonín District
Czechoslovak emigrants to Austria
Czech male pair skaters
Czechoslovak male pair skaters
European Figure Skating Championships medalists
Czech figure skating coaches
Sportspeople from the South Moravian Region